John Peter Rhys Williams  (born 2 March 1949) is a former Welsh rugby union player who represented Wales in international rugby during their Golden Era in the 1970s. 
He became known universally as J. P. R. Williams (or sometimes just as JPR) after 1973 when J. J. Williams (also John) joined the Welsh team.

Playing in the position of full back, he was noted for his aggressive attacking style. With his long sideboards and socks around his ankles, "JPR" was an iconic figure on the legendary 1970s Wales team. However, despite playing full back throughout his international career, his favourite position was flanker, where he played for Tondu at the end of his career.

He is one of a small group of Welsh players to have won three Grand Slams including Gerald Davies, Gareth Edwards, Ryan Jones, Adam Jones, Gethin Jenkins and Alun Wyn Jones.

An orthopaedic surgeon by profession, Williams has continued to be involved in rugby since retirement, currently serving as president of the Bridgend Ravens.

Early life
Williams was born just outside Bridgend, Wales, and was educated at Bridgend Boys Grammar School (now Brynteg Comprehensive School) and then Millfield School in Somerset, as was his Wales teammate Gareth Edwards.

As well as being a rugby union player, Williams was also a successful tennis player at youth level, before fully committing to rugby. He won the 1966 British Junior title at the All England Lawn Tennis and Croquet Club in Wimbledon, beating David Lloyd 6–4, 6–4; this is often erroneously cited as being a Junior Wimbledon victory, including in J.P.R.'s autobiography, when in fact it was won by Vladimir Korotkov.

Rugby career 
Williams' focus moved from tennis to rugby union, which was an amateur sport, in order to pursue a career in medicine. He quickly attracted attention and was consequently first capped by Wales in 1969, aged 19.

He went on to earn 55 caps for Wales, five as captain, and eight for the British and Irish Lions.

He played club rugby for Bridgend, London Welsh and Tondu. He also played a few games for  shortly after the 1974 Lions tour.

Williams had many high points in his career, being a key player in a Welsh side that won Grand Slams in 1971, 1976, and 1978, and is particularly remembered for his record against England. In 10 tests between Wales and England he scored five tries – exceptional for a fullback – and was never on the losing side. He was also outstanding for the Lions, winning the 1971 series against New Zealand with a long-range drop-goal. In the 1974 'invincible' series against South Africa he again played a major role.

He is known for developing the role of the fullback, in particular attacking from a defensive position often following an audacious jump for a high ball. He is also remembered for his part in The greatest try ever scored.

Williams chose not to go on the 1977 British Lions tour to New Zealand, after being advised by his consultant to focus on his medical career. In the same year he was appointed MBE (Member of the Order of the British Empire) for services to Rugby.

Williams was one of the inaugural inductees of the International Rugby Hall of Fame in 1997.

Williams retired from international rugby union in 1981 and continued his career as an orthopaedic surgeon. However, he continued to play club rugby for many years, playing throughout the 1980s and 1990s for Bridgend and then for Tondu Thirds into his fifties. He finally retired in March 2003.

Non-rugby career 
Williams has represented several cricket teams, particularly the Lord's Taverners team, between 1976 and 2004.

Williams studied medicine at St Mary's Hospital Medical School, qualifying as a physician in 1973. He became a Fellow of the Royal College of Surgeons in 1980. In 2012 was chosen by Move Sports to be the ambassador of the 2012 Portugal Rugby Festival.

He was the subject of This Is Your Life in 1979 when he was surprised by Eamonn Andrews at Thames Television's Teddington Studios.

In January 2006, in a party of 16 Welsh men and women, he climbed Mount Kilimanjaro in Tanzania for charity, helping to raise more than £200,000 for the NSPCC's 'Full Stop' Campaign.

Welsh honours and statistics 
 First cap: 1 February 1969, Murrayfield, Scotland ( 3 – Wales 17)
 His fifty-five caps comprised 37 wins, four draws, and 14 defeats
 Member of three Grand Slam-winning teams: 1971, 1976, 1978.
 Member of six Triple Crown-winning teams: 1969, 1971, 1976, 1977, 1978, 1979
 Scored 36 points (five four-point tries and one three-point try; three penalty goals and two conversions)
 Captained Wales five times (1978–79 – Championship and Triple Crown Season)
 Final cap: 7 February 1981, Murrayfield, Scotland ( 15 – Wales 6)
(Source)

References

External links

 at The International Rugby Hall of Fame
Profile at ESPN Scrum
100 Welsh Heroes: #24 J.P.R. Williams
Small talk: J.P.R. Williams , Paul Doyle, The Guardian, 6 October 2006
J.P.R. Williams, full back, BBC News, 18 March 2005
Gavin Henson interview: J.P.R. Williams, The Observer, 6 November 2005

1949 births
Living people
20th-century surgeons
20th-century Welsh medical doctors
21st-century Welsh medical doctors
Alumni of St Mary's Hospital Medical School
Barbarian F.C. players
Bridgend RFC players
British & Irish Lions rugby union players from Wales
British orthopaedic surgeons
Conservative Party (UK) people
Crawshays RFC players
Fellows of the Royal College of Surgeons
London Welsh RFC players
Members of the Order of the British Empire
People educated at Millfield
People educated at Ysgol Brynteg
Physicians of St Mary's Hospital, London
Rugby union fullbacks
Rugby union players from Bridgend
Tondu RFC players
Wales international rugby union players
Wales rugby union captains
Welsh rugby union players
World Rugby Hall of Fame inductees